In algebraic geometry, a local ring A is said to be unibranch if the reduced ring Ared (obtained by quotienting A by its nilradical) is an integral domain, and the integral closure B of Ared is also a local ring. A unibranch local ring is said to be geometrically unibranch if the residue field of B is a purely inseparable extension of the residue field of Ared. A complex variety X is called topologically unibranch at a point x if for all complements Y of closed algebraic subsets of X there is a fundamental system of neighborhoods (in the classical topology) of x whose intersection with Y is connected. 

In particular, a normal ring is unibranch. The notions of unibranch and geometrically unibranch points are used in some theorems in algebraic geometry. For example, there is the following result:

Theorem  Let X and Y be two integral locally noetherian schemes and  a proper dominant morphism. Denote their function fields by K(X) and K(Y), respectively. Suppose that the algebraic closure of K(Y) in K(X) has separable degree n and that  is unibranch. Then the fiber  has at most n connected components. In particular, if f is birational, then the fibers of unibranch points are connected.

In EGA, the theorem is obtained as a corollary of Zariski's main theorem.

References

Algebraic geometry
Commutative algebra